The 2013 Grand National (officially known as the John Smith's Grand National for sponsorship reasons) was the 166th annual running of the Grand National horse race at Aintree Racecourse near Liverpool, England. The showpiece steeplechase, which concluded a three-day meeting (one of only four held at Aintree throughout the year), took place on 6 April 2013. The maximum permitted field of 40 runners competed for a share of the £975,000 prize fund, which made the National the most valuable jump race in Europe.

The race was won by 66/1 shot Auroras Encore, who was ridden by jockey Ryan Mania for trainer Sue Smith. The 11/2 favourite Seabass, ridden by Katie Walsh, finished in 13th place.
During the race only two horses fell and six unseated their riders; 17 completed the course and all 40 that ran returned safely to the stables.

The race was broadcast on Channel 4 for the first time as it took over the broadcasting rights for a four-year period to 2016. The BBC had broadcast the race every year since it was first televised in 1960 and first aired on radio in 1927. The BBC retain the UK radio coverage rights.

Safety changes

In addition to modifications made for the previous year's race, Aintree announced that a number of further changes had been made for the 2013 National.

Twelve of the 16 fences on the course were rebuilt with the timber frames within them replaced by a softer material known as "plastic birch". The fences are still covered with at least 14 inches of spruce and will remain the same height. The starting line was also moved 90 yards closer to the first fence, further away from the spectators' stands and thereby reducing slightly the overall distance.

Aintree and the Professional Jockeys' Association jointly issued a note urging participating jockeys to avoid a false start by paying more attention to the starter's orders, and to better control their speed during the race.

In response to the further changes, David Muir of the RSPCA said: "They have done more than I thought they would. Fundamentally the changes that have been made are major already. They've taken the cores of the fences out, there is a cooling down area now, there's a water system and there's a reduction in the number of drop fences; [however] we'd still like to see changes to Becher's Brook, the drop is still a concern."

Race card

Entries for the race had to be submitted by 30 January 2013. Aintree announced that 84 horses had been entered for consideration in the 2013 Grand National, including last year's runner-up Sunnyhillboy, as well as Seabass and Cappa Bleu, third and fourth in the 2012 race respectively. Others hoping to return to the National for 2013 included Oscar Time, Big Fella Thanks, What A Friend, Cloudy Lane, Calgary Bay, and 2011 winner Ballabriggs.

Eight of the entrants were trained in Wales, including Cappa Bleu; the only Welsh-trained horse to have won the Grand National was Kirkland in 1905. Thirty-two of the 84 were trained in Ireland.

Handicap weights were announced by the British Horseracing Authority in London on 12 February. The top weight of 11 st 10 lb was allotted to Tidal Bay, trained by last year's winning trainer Paul Nicholls, however the horse was withdrawn two days later with a stress fracture of the lower cannon bone on his right hind leg. 2010 Cheltenham Gold Cup winner Imperial Commander now carries top weight. The National's official betting partner, Betfred, put Seabass (11 st 2 lb), On His Own (10 st 10 lb), and Prince De Beauchene (11 st 3 lb) as joint-favourites upon announcement of the handicaps. Prince De Beauchene was later withdrawn with a stress fracture.

There were scratchings' deadlines on 26 February and 19 March, after which 57 entries remained. 1 April marked the five-day confirmation stage at which 49 horses remained and were ranked according to their ratings. On 4 April the final field of 40 runners was declared:

Great Britain unless stated.
Amateur jockeys denoted by preceding title, e.g. Mr.

Race overview

The starter Hugh Barclay got the field of 40 horses off and running at the first attempt, the start line having been moved 90 yards closer to the first fence and further away from the spectators' stands. Seabass was sent off as 11/2 favourite, with jockey Katie Walsh becoming the first female rider to start a Grand National as favourite. Her brother Ruby Walsh was second-favourite on board On His Own.

For the first time in history, all 40 runners made it to the Canal Turn – the eighth of the 30 fences – without mishap. Across the Bay led over the Turn from Balthazar King, while three riders were unseated. Andrew Thornton became the first of only two jockeys in the 2013 National to fall from his mount as the field streamed over the 12th fence.

The Chair is the penultimate fence on the first circuit and marked the end of the race for champion jockey Tony McCoy who was unseated from Colbert Station. Thirty-two of the 40 participants were still in contention going onto the second circuit, led by Across the Bay from Balthazar King, Oscar Time, and Teaforthree.

All the remaining runners safely jumped the second Becher's Brook, the first time since 1996 that the famous fence had not claimed any fallers. Ruby Walsh fell at Valentine's (the 25th fence) after which several runners had been pulled up, leaving 21 still racing. Irish-trained Oscar Time and Welsh-trained Teaforthree led the field, with Auroras Encore emerging in third position. At the final fence, Paul Carberry pulled up Chicago Grey while Mumbles Head refused and two other horses unseated their riders.

At the elbow on the 494-yard run-in, Auroras Encore had extended his lead over Teaforthree and Oscar Time, the latter fading and quickly overtaken by Cappa Bleu. At the line, the pairing of Auroras Encore and Ryan Mania – taking his first ride in the Grand National – won by a distance of nine lengths, Cappa Bleu pipped Teaforthree for second place, Oscar Time finished in fourth and Rare Bob was fifth. Seventeen runners completed the course.

Finishing order

Non-finishers

Colours

Reaction
Sue Smith became only the third woman to train a Grand National winner, after Jenny Pitman (1983 and 1995) and Venetia Williams (2009). Smith said afterward: "I knew the ground was right for him and hoped everything else was. He stayed down the middle and had a bit of luck in running. He didn't have a lot of weight and that helped, too."

Auroras Encore was jockey Ryan Mania's first ride in the National. He said after his victory: "There are no words to describe it. I got a dream ride round. I couldn't believe my luck." Mania added that he could not "go too mad" with his celebrations as he was due to race at Hexham the next day. He did race the following afternoon, but was injured in a fall during the St. John Lee Handicap Hurdle and had to be airlifted to Newcastle Royal Infirmary where he was described as being in a "stable" condition. He was released from hospital two days later with minor neck and back injuries, saying he was "feeling a bit tired and a bit sore but apart from that I'm OK, it's nothing serious."

With two equine fatalities in each of the two previous Nationals, much of the media commentary after the 2013 race hailed the fact that all 40 runners had returned safely to the stables and that only two had fallen at the modified fences. The RSPCA's chief executive Gavin Grant said that his organisation was "delighted that the changes seem to have contributed to a safe yet competitive race." Roly Owers of World Horse Welfare added: "Aintree can take considerable credit for the improvements they have made to the course. It is too early to say with certainty whether the softer fences are making a difference, but ... the initial signs are encouraging."

Channel 4 enjoyed a 61% share of the UK terrestrial television audience at its peak during the race. Though its peak viewing figures were down by 2 million from the 2012 race which was broadcast on the BBC and watched by nearly 11 million in the UK, they were slightly above those registered by the BBC in 2011 and 2009 and more than 1 million above those achieved in 2010.

Broadcasting

As the Grand National is accorded the status of an event of national interest in the United Kingdom and is listed on the Ofcom Code on Sports and Other Listed and Designated Events, it must be shown on free-to-air terrestrial television in the UK. Channel 4 took over the broadcasting rights from the BBC for a four-year period from 2013.

Clare Balding and Nick Luck presented Channel 4's coverage, supported by Jim McGrath, Mick Fitzgerald and Graham Cunningham. Reports were provided by Rishi Persad and Alice Plunkett and betting updates by Tanya Stevenson and Brian Gleeson. Balding, Fitzgerald and Persad were previously regulars of BBC's coverage team for the race in recent years. The commentary team was composed of Richard Hoiles, Ian Bartlett (also previously part of the BBC's team) and Simon Holt. As lead commentator for Channel 4, Holt called the winner home for the first time. After the race, Nick Luck, Mick Fitzgerald and Richard Hoiles provided the viewers with a detailed re-run of the race.

Whereas the BBC lost the television rights for the race, its radio station 5 Live broadcast the race as before, the 81st consecutive running of the National to be covered live on BBC radio.

See also
Horseracing in Great Britain
List of British National Hunt races

References

2013
Grand National
Grand National
Grand National
21st century in Merseyside
Grand